Gege Gatt (born December 4, 1978) is an entrepreneur, businessperson and an IT lawyer from Malta. He is known for being the co-founder and CEO of EBO, an Artificial Intelligence (AI) company and the Chairman of Beacon Media Group. He is also the director of ICON, a software development company, and a Board Member of the Malta IT Law Association.

Early life and education 

Gatt was born on December 4, 1978. He received his Bachelor’s degree in Legal & Humanistic Studies focusing on Sociology, and a Doctoral Degree in Law from the University of Malta.

Business career

Gatt is the CEO of EBO, a technology and AI company that helps enterprises automate customer engagement. In June 2020, EBO collaborated with BMIT Technologies PLC to provide AI-driven customer engagement tools and subsequently received Series A investment from them. EBO has partnered with KPMG to provide AI services in technology advisory, and has also collaborated with UK’s NHS for healthcare technology services.  

Gatt served as Chairman of Beacon Media Group from 2019 till 2021. Under his leadership, the media group has seen increase in number of users, page views, sessions and weekday audiences throughout Newsbook, the online news publication and 103 Malta’s Heart, the national radio station. 

He is also the director of ICON, a software development firm.

Legal career 

Gatt is the Vice President of the Malta IT Law Association. He is active in researching the European digital environment, specifically cybersecurity and privacy legislation.

Publications

References

External link 

1978 births
Living people
University of Malta alumni
Businesspeople in software
Artificial intelligence researchers
Machine learning researchers
21st-century Maltese lawyers
Maltese chief executives